The Pfizer–BioNTech COVID-19 vaccine (INN: tozinameran), sold under the brand name Comirnaty, is an mRNA-based COVID-19 vaccine developed by the German biotechnology company BioNTech. For its development, BioNTech collaborated with American company Pfizer to carry out clinical trials, logistics, and manufacturing. It is authorized for use in people to provide protection against COVID-19, caused by infection with the SARS-CoV-2 virus. The vaccine is given by intramuscular injection. It is composed of nucleoside-modified mRNA (modRNA) encoding a mutated form of the full-length spike protein of SARS-CoV-2, which is encapsulated in lipid nanoparticles. Initial advice indicated that vaccination required two doses given 21 days apart, but the interval was later extended to up to 42 days in the US, and up to four months in Canada.

Clinical trials began in April 2020; by November 2020, the vaccine entered phaseIII clinical trials, with over 40,000 people participating. An interim analysis of study data showed a potential efficacy of 91.3% in preventing symptomatic infection within seven days of a second dose and no serious safety concerns. Most side effects are mild to moderate in severity and are gone within a few days. The most common include mild to moderate pain at the injection site, fatigue, and headaches. Reports of serious side effects, such as allergic reactions, are very rare and no long-term complications have been reported.

The vaccine is the first COVID19 vaccine to be authorized by a stringent regulatory authority for emergency use and the first cleared for regular use. In December 2020, the United Kingdom was the first country to authorize its use on an emergency basis. It is authorized for use at some level in the majority of countries. On 23 August 2021, the Pfizer–BioNTech vaccine became the first COVID-19 vaccine to be approved in the United States by the Food and Drug Administration (FDA). Distribution and storage is a logistical challenge because the vaccine needs to be stored at extremely low temperatures.

In August 2022, a bivalent version of the vaccine (Pfizer-BioNTech COVID-19 Vaccine, Bivalent) was authorized for use as a booster dose in individuals twelve years of age and older in the United States. In September 2022, the BA.1 version of the bivalent vaccine (Comirnaty Original/Omicron BA.1 or tozinameran/riltozinameran) was authorized as a booster for use in the United Kingdom. In September 2022, the European Union authorized both the BA.1 and the BA.4/BA.5 (tozinameran/famtozinameran) booster versions of the bivalent vaccine.

Medical uses 
The Pfizer–BioNTech COVID-19 vaccine is used to provide protection against COVID-19, caused by infection with the SARS-CoV-2 virus, by eliciting an immune response to the S antigen. The vaccine is used to reduce morbidity and mortality from COVID-19.

The vaccine is supplied in a multidose vial as "a white to off-white, sterile, preservative-free, frozen suspension for intramuscular injection". It must be thawed to room temperature and diluted with normal saline before administration.

The initial course consists of two doses. The World Health Organization (WHO) recommends an interval of three to four weeks between doses. Delaying the second dose by up to twelve weeks increases immunogenicity, even in older adults, against all variants of concern. Authors of the Pitch study think that the optimal interval against the Delta variant is around eight weeks, with longer intervals leaving receptors vulnerable between doses.

A third, fourth, or fifth dose can be added in some countries.

Effectiveness

A test-negative case-control study published in August 2021, found that two doses of the BNT162b2 (Pfizer) vaccine had 93.7% effectiveness against symptomatic disease caused by the alpha (B.1.1.7) variant and 88.0% effectiveness against symptomatic disease caused by the delta (B.1.617.2) variant. Notably, effectiveness after one dose of the Pfizer vaccine was 48.7% against alpha and 30.7% against delta, similar to effectiveness provided by one dose of the ChAdOx1 nCoV-19 vaccine.

Unless indicated otherwise, the following effectiveness ratings are indicative of clinical effectiveness two weeks after the second dose. A vaccine is generally considered effective if the estimate is ≥50% with a >30% lower limit of the 95% confidence interval. Effectiveness is generally expected to slowly decrease over time.

On 12 November, Public Health England reported a possible but extremely small reduction in effectiveness against symptomatic disease from the Delta sublineage AY.4.2 at longer intervals after the second dose.

Preliminary data suggest that the effectiveness against the Omicron variant starts to decline in about 10 weeks, either after the initial two-dose regimen or after the booster dose. For other variants, the effectiveness of the initial doses starts to decline in about six months. A similar trajectory was observed against symptomatic disease and against specific variants.

On 21 October, a phase 3 trial showed that a booster dose given approximately 11 months after the second dose restored the protective effect to the  efficacy level against symptomatic disease from the Delta variant.

On 8 December, Pfizer and BioNTech reported that preliminary data indicated that a third dose of the vaccine would provide a similar level of neutralizing antibodies against the Omicron variant as seen after two doses against other variants.

On 14 December, private health insurer Discovery Health, in collaboration with the South African Medical Research Council, reported that real-world data from more than 211,000 cases of COVID-19 in South Africa, of which 78,000 were of the Omicron variant, indicate that effectiveness against the variant after two doses is about 70% against hospital admission and 33% against symptomatic disease. Protection against hospital admission is maintained for all ages and groups with comorbidities.

A study of the bivalent booster effectiveness against severe COVID-19 outcomes in Finland, September 2022–January 2023, has shown that it reduced the risk of severe COVID-19 outcomes among the elderly. By contrast, among the chronically-ill 18–64-year-olds the risk was similar among those who received bivalent vaccine and those who did not. Among the elderly a bivalent booster provided highest protection during the first two months after vaccination, but thereafter signs of waning were observed. The effectiveness among individuals aged 65–79 years and those aged 80 years or more was similar.

Specific populations 
Based on the results of a preliminary study, the U.S. Centers for Disease Control and Prevention (CDC) recommends that pregnant women get vaccinated with the COVID19 vaccine.

A statement by the British Medicines and Healthcare products Regulatory Agency (MHRA) and the Commission on Human Medicines (CHM) reported that the two agencies had reached a conclusion that the vaccine is safe and effective in children aged between 12 and 15 years.

On 19 May 2021, experts commissioned by the Norwegian Medicines Agency concluded that the Pfizer-BioNTech vaccine is the likely cause of ten deaths of frail elderly patients in Norwegian nursing homes. They said that people with very short life expectancies have little to gain from vaccination, having a real risk of adverse reactions in the last days of life and of dying earlier.

A 2021 report by the New South Wales Government (NSW Health) in Australia found that the Pfizer-BioNTech vaccine is safe for those with various forms of immunodeficiency or immunosuppression, though it does note that the data on said groups is limited, due to their exclusion from many of the vaccine earlier trials held in 2020. It notes that the World Health Organization advises that the vaccine is among the three COVID-19 vaccines (alongside that of Moderna and AstraZeneca) it deems safe to give to immunocompromised individuals, and that expert consensus generally recommends their vaccination. The report states that the vaccines were able to generate an immune response in those individuals, though it does also note that this response is weaker than in those that are not immunocompromised. It recommends that specific patient groups, such as those with cancer, inflammatory bowel disease and various liver diseases be prioritised in the vaccination schedules over other patients that do not have said conditions.

On 20 September 2021, Pfizer announced that a clinical trial conducted in more than 2,200 children aged 5–11 has generated a "robust" response and is safe.

Adverse effects

In large phase 3 trials for the vaccine there were no reported serious safety findings, and it observed low incidence of serious adverse events.

Most side effects of the Pfizer–BioNTech COVID19 vaccine are mild to moderate in severity and are gone within a few days. They are similar to other adult vaccines and are normal signs that the body is building protection to the virus. During clinical trials, the common side effects affecting more than 1 in 10 people are (in order of frequency): pain and swelling at the injection site, tiredness, headache, muscle aches, chills, joint pain, and fever. Fever is more common after the second dose.

The European Medicines Agency (EMA) regularly reviews the data on the vaccine's safety. The safety report published on 8 September 2021, by the EMA was based on over 392million doses administered in the European Union. According to the EMA "the benefits of Comirnaty in preventing COVID19 continue to outweigh any risks, and there are no recommended changes regarding the use of this vaccine." Rare side effects (that may affect up to 1 in 1,000 people) include temporary one sided facial drooping and allergic reactions such as hives or swelling of the face.

Allergy 
Documented hypersensitivity to polyethylene glycol (PEG) (a very rare allergy) is listed as a contraindication to the COVID-19 Pfizer vaccine. Severe allergic reaction has been observed in approximately eleven cases per million doses of vaccine administered. According to a report by the US Centers for Disease Control and Prevention, 71% of those allergic reactions happened within 15 minutes of vaccination and mostly (81%) among people with a documented history of allergies or allergic reactions. The UK's Medicines and Healthcare products Regulatory Agency (MHRA) advised on 9December 2020 that people who have a history of "significant" allergic reaction should not receive the Pfizer–BioNTech COVID19 vaccine. On 12 December, the Canadian regulator followed suit, noting that: "Both individuals in the U.K. had a history of severe allergic reactions and carried adrenaline auto injectors. They both were treated and have recovered."

Myocarditis 
In June 2021, the Israel's Ministry of Health announced a probable relationship between the second dose and myocarditis in a small group of 16–30-year-old men. Between December 2020 and May 2021, there were 55 cases of myocarditis per 1million people vaccinated, 95% of which were classified as mild and most spent no more than four days in the hospital. Since April 2021, increasing number of cases of myocarditis and pericarditis have been reported in the United States in about 13 per 1million young people, mostly male and over the age of 16, after vaccination with the Pfizer–BioNTech or the Moderna vaccine. Most affected individuals recover quickly with adequate treatment and rest. Since February 2022, the German Standing Committee on Vaccination recommends aspiration for COVID-19 vaccination as precautionary measure.

Pharmacology

The BioNTech technology for the BNT162b2 vaccine is based on use of nucleoside-modified mRNA (modRNA) which encodes a mutated form of the full-length spike protein found on the surface of the SARS-CoV-2 virus, triggering an immune response against infection by the virus protein.

Sequence
The modRNA sequence of the vaccine is 4,284 nucleotides long. It consists of a five-prime cap; a five prime untranslated region derived from the sequence of human alpha globin; a signal peptide (bases 55–102) and two proline substitutions (K986P and V987P, designated "2P") that cause the spike to adopt a prefusion-stabilized conformation reducing the membrane fusion ability, increasing expression and stimulating neutralizing antibodies; a codon-optimized gene of the full-length spike protein of SARS-CoV-2 (bases 103–3879); followed by a three prime untranslated region (bases 3880–4174) combined from AES and mtRNR1 selected for increased protein expression and mRNA stability and a poly(A) tail comprising 30 adenosine residues, a 10-nucleotide linker sequence, and 70 other adenosine residues (bases 4175–4284). The sequence contains no uridine residues; they are replaced by 1-methyl-3'-pseudouridylyl. The 2P proline substitutions in the spike proteins were originally developed for a Middle East respiratory syndrome (MERS) vaccine by researchers at the National Institute of Allergy and Infectious Diseases' Vaccine Research Center, Scripps Research, and Jason McLellan's team (at the University of Texas at Austin, previously at Dartmouth College).

Chemistry
In addition to the mRNA molecule, the vaccine contains the following inactive ingredients (excipients):
 ALC-0315, ((4-hydroxybutyl)azanediyl)bis(hexane-6,1-diyl)bis(2-hexyldecanoate)
 ALC-0159, 2-[(polyethylene glycol)-2000]-N,N-ditetradecylacetamide
 1,2-distearoyl-sn-glycero-3-phosphocholine (DSPC)
 cholesterol
 dibasic sodium phosphate dihydrate
 monobasic potassium phosphate
 potassium chloride
 sodium chloride
 sucrose
 water for injection

The first four of these are lipids. The lipids and modRNA together form nanoparticles that act not only as carriers to get the modRNA into the human cells, but also as adjuvants. ALC-0159 is a polyethylene glycol conjugate, i.e., a PEGylated lipid.

Manufacturing

Pfizer and BioNTech are manufacturing the vaccine in their own facilities in the United States and in Europe. The license to distribute and manufacture the vaccine in China was purchased by Fosun, alongside its investment in BioNTech.

Manufacturing the vaccine requires a three-stage process. The first stage involves the molecular cloning of DNA plasmids that code for the spike protein by infusing them into Escherichia coli bacteria. For all markets, this stage is conducted in the United States, at a small Pfizer pilot plant in Chesterfield, Missouri (near St. Louis). After four days of growth, the bacteria are killed and broken open, and the contents of their cells are purified over a week and a half to recover the desired DNA product. The DNA is bottled and frozen for shipment. Safely and quickly transporting the DNA at this stage is so important that Pfizer has used its company jet and helicopter to assist.

The second stage is being conducted at a Pfizer plant in Andover, Massachusetts, in the United States, and at BioNTech's plants in Germany. The DNA is used as a template to build the desired mRNA strands, which takes about four days. Once the mRNA has been created and purified, it is frozen in plastic bags about the size of a large shopping bag, of which each can hold up to 10million doses. The bags are placed on trucks which take them to the next plant.

The third stage is being conducted at Pfizer plants in Portage, Michigan (near Kalamazoo) in the United States, and Puurs in Belgium. This stage involves combining the mRNA with lipid nanoparticles, then filling vials, boxing vials, and freezing them. Croda International subsidiary Avanti Polar Lipids is providing the requisite lipids. As of November 2020, the major bottleneck in the manufacturing process is combining mRNA with lipid nanoparticles. At this stage, it takes only four days to go from mRNA and lipids to finished vials, but each lot must then spend several weeks in deep-freeze storage while undergoing verification against 40 quality-control measures.

Before May 2021, the Pfizer plant in Puurs was responsible for all vials for destinations outside the United States. Therefore, all doses administered in the Americas outside of the United States before that point in time required at least two transatlantic flights (one to take DNA to Europe and one to bring back finished vaccine vials).

In February 2021, BioNTech announced it would increase production by more than 50% to manufacture 2billion doses in 2021, raised again at the end of March to 2.5billion doses in 2021.

In February 2021, Pfizer revealed that the entire sequence initially took about 110 days on average from start to finish, and that the company is making progress on reducing the time to 60 days. More than half the days in the production process are dedicated to rigorous testing and quality assurance at each of the three stages. Pfizer also revealed that the process requires 280 components and relies upon 25 suppliers located in 19 countries.

Vaccine manufacturers normally take several years to optimize the process of making a particular vaccine for speed and cost-effectiveness before attempting large-scale production. Due to the urgency presented by the COVID19 pandemic, Pfizer and BioNTech began production immediately with the process by which the vaccine had been originally formulated in the laboratory, then started to identify ways to safely speed up and scale up that process.BioNTech announced in September 2020, that it had signed an agreement to acquire a manufacturing facility in Marburg, Germany, from Novartis to expand their vaccine production capacity. Once fully operational, the facility would produce up to 750million doses per year, or more than 60million doses per month. The site will be the third BioNTech facility in Europe that produces the vaccine, while Pfizer operates at least four production sites in the United States and Europe.

The Marburg facility had previously specialized in cancer immunotherapy for Novartis. By the end of March 2021, BioNTech had finished retrofitting the facility for mRNA vaccine production and retraining its 300 staff, and obtained approval to begin manufacturing. Besides making mRNA, the Marburg facility also performs the step of combining mRNA with lipids to form lipid nanoparticles, then ships the vaccine in bulk to other facilities for fill and finish (i.e., filling and boxing vials).

On 23 April 2021, the EMA authorized an increase in batch size and associated process scale up at Pfizer's plant in Puurs. This increase is expected to have a significant impact on the supply of the vaccine in the European Union.

At the end of April 2021, it was reported that Pfizer had started to export vaccine doses to Mexico and Canada from the Kalamazoo plant, which is much closer geographically to both countries than the Puurs plant.

Logistics
The vaccine is delivered in vials that, once diluted, contain 2.25 mL of vaccine, comprising 0.45 mL frozen and 1.8 mL diluent. According to the vial labels, each vial contains five 0.3 mL doses, however excess vaccine may be used for one, or possibly two, additional doses. The use of low dead space syringes to obtain the additional doses is preferable, and partial doses within a vial should be discarded. The Italian Medicines Agency officially authorized the use of excess doses remaining within single vials. The Danish Health Authority allows mixing partial doses from two vials. As of 8January 2021, each vial contains six doses.

Low-income countries have limited cold chain capacity for ultracold transport and storage of a vaccine. The necessary storage temperatures for the vaccine are much lower than for the similar Moderna vaccine. The head of Indonesia's Bio Farma Honesti Basyir said purchasing the vaccine is out of the question for the world's fourth-most populous country, given that it did not have the necessary cold chain capability.

History
Before COVID19 vaccines, a vaccine for an infectious disease had never before been produced in less than several years, and no vaccine existed for preventing a coronavirus infection in humans. The SARS-CoV-2 virus, which causes COVID19, was detected in December 2019, and BioNTech began development of a COVID19 vaccine on 10 January 2020, when the SARS-CoV-2 genetic sequences were released by the Chinese Center for Disease Control and Prevention via GISAID, triggering an urgent international response to prepare for an outbreak and hasten development of preventive vaccines.

The vaccine's development began when BioNTech founder Uğur Şahin read an article in the medical journal The Lancet that convinced him the COVID19 coronavirus in China would soon become a global pandemic, so he called for scientists at the company to cancel their vacations and start development of a COVID19 vaccine in January 2020. BioNTech started its program 'Project Lightspeed' to develop a vaccine against the new COVID19 virus based on its already established mRNA-technology, which they had been developing since leading mRNA researcher Katalin Karikó joined the company in 2013. Several variants of the vaccine were created in their laboratories in Mainz, and 20 of those were presented to experts of the Paul Ehrlich Institute in Langen.

Meanwhile, since 2018, Pfizer had been working with BioNTech on developing a mRNA vaccine for influenza, but the chief executive officers of the two companies did not become personally acquainted until COVID-19 came along. After a few phone calls, Pfizer CEO Albert Bourla and Şahin agreed that their companies would work together on the development of BioNTech's COVID-19 vaccine. To the horror of Pfizer's lawyers, the two agreed to begin work immediately, because time was of the essence, with no formal written legal agreement in place to govern the new collaboration. BioNTech transferred its know-how to Pfizer the next day. A letter of intent was signed three weeks later, and the formal commercial agreement between Pfizer and BioNTech for the COVID-19 vaccine was signed in January 2021.

Funding
According to Pfizer, research and development for the vaccine cost close to billion.

BioNTech received a  investment from Fosun in March 2020, in exchange for 1.58million shares in BioNTech and the future development and marketing rights of BNT162b2 in China.

In April 2020, BioNTech signed a partnership with Pfizer and received $185million, including an equity investment of approximately $113million.

In June 2020, BioNTech received  in financing from the European Commission and European Investment Bank. The Bank's deal with BioNTech started early in the pandemic, when the Bank's staff reviewed its portfolio and came up with BioNTech as one of the companies capable of developing a COVID19 vaccine. The European Investment Bank had already signed a first transaction with BioNTech in 2019.

In September 2020, the German government granted BioNTech  for its COVID19 vaccine development program.

Pfizer CEO Albert Bourla said he decided against taking funding from the US government's Operation Warp Speed for the development of the vaccine "because I wanted to liberate our scientists [from] any bureaucracy that comes with having to give reports and agree how we are going to spend the money in parallel or together, etc." Pfizer did enter into an agreement with the US for the eventual distribution of the vaccine, as with other countries.

Clinical trials

PhaseI–II Trials were started in Germany on 23 April 2020, and in the U.S. on 4May 2020, with four vaccine candidates entering clinical testing. The vaccine candidate BNT162b2 was chosen as the most promising among three others with similar technology developed by BioNTech. Before choosing BNT162b2, BioNTech and Pfizer had conducted phaseI trials on BNT162b1 in Germany and the United States, while Fosun performed a PhaseI trial in China. In these PhaseI studies, BNT162b2 was shown to have a better safety profile than the other three BioNTech candidates.

The Pivotal PhaseII–III Trial with the lead vaccine candidate "BNT162b2" began in July. Preliminary results from PhaseI–II clinical trials on BNT162b2, published in October 2020, indicated potential for its safety and efficacy. During the same month, the European Medicines Agency (EMA) began a periodic review of BNT162b2.

The study of BNT162b2 is a continuous-phase trial in phaseIII as of November 2020. It is a "randomized, placebo-controlled, observer-blind, dose-finding, vaccine candidate-selection, and efficacy study in healthy individuals". The study expanded during mid-2020 to assess efficacy and safety of BNT162b2 in greater numbers of participants, reaching tens of thousands of people receiving test vaccinations in multiple countries in collaboration with Pfizer and Fosun.

The phase III trial assesses the safety, efficacy, tolerability, and immunogenicity of BNT162b2 at a mid-dose level (two injections separated by 21 days) in three age groups: 12–15 years, 16–55 years or above 55 years. The PhaseIII results indicating a 95% efficacy of the developed vaccine were published on 18 November 2020. For approval in the EU, an overall vaccine efficacy of 95% was confirmed by the EMA. The EMA clarified that the second dose should be administered three weeks after the first dose.

At 14 days after dose 1, the cumulative incidence begins to diverge between the vaccinated group and the placebo group. The highest concentration of neutralizing antibodies is reached 7 days after dose 2 in younger adults and 14 days after dose 2 in older adults.

The ongoing phase III trial, which is scheduled to run from 2020 to 2022, is designed to assess the ability of BNT162b2 to prevent severe infection, as well as the duration of immune effect.

High antibody activity persists for at least three months after the second dose, with an estimated antibody half-life of 55 days. From these data, one study suggested that antibodies might remain detectable for around 554 days.

Specific populations 

Pfizer and BioNTech started a PhaseII–III randomized control trial in healthy pregnant women 18 years of age and older (NCT04754594). The study will evaluate 30mcg of BNT162b2 or placebo administered via intramuscular injection in two doses, 21 days apart. The PhaseII portion of the study will include approximately 350 pregnant women randomized 1:1 to receive BNT162b2 or placebo at 27 to 34 weeks' gestation. The PhaseIII portion of this study will assess the safety, tolerability, and immunogenicity of BNT162b2 or placebo among pregnant women enrolled at 24 to 34 weeks' gestation. Pfizer and BioNTech announced on 18 February 2021 that the first participants received their first dose in this trial.

A study published in March 2021, in the American Journal of Obstetrics and Gynecology came to the conclusion that messenger RNA vaccines against the novel coronavirus, such as the Pfizer-BioNTech and Moderna vaccines were safe and effective at providing immunity against infection to pregnant and breastfeeding mothers. Furthermore, they found that naturally occurring antibodies created by the mother's immune system were passed on to their children via the placenta and/or breastmilk, thus resulting in passive immunity among the child, effectively giving the child protection against the disease. The study also found that vaccine-induced immunity among the study's participants was stronger in a statistically significant way over immunity gained through recovery from a natural COVID19 infection. In addition, the study reported that the occurrence and intensity of potential side effects in those undergoing pregnancy or lactating was very similar to those expected from non-pregnant populations, remaining generally very minor and well tolerated, mostly including injection site soreness, minor headaches, muscles aches or fatigue for a short period of time.

In January 2021, Pfizer said it had finished enrolling 2,259 children aged between 12 and 15 years to study the vaccine's safety and efficacy.
On 31 March 2021, Pfizer and BioNTech announced from initial PhaseIII trial data that the vaccine is 100% effective for those aged 12 to 15 years of age, with trials for those younger still in progress.

A research letter published in JAMA reported that the vaccines appeared to be safe for immunosuppressed organ transplant recipients, but that the resulting antibody response was considerably poorer than in the non-immunocompromised population after only one dose. The paper admitted the limitation of only reviewing the data following the first dose of a two-dose cycle vaccine.

On 2 November 2021, The BMJ published a piece by journalist Paul D. Thacker alleging there has been "poor practice" at Ventavia, one of the companies involved in the phase III evaluation trials of the Pfizer vaccine. The report was enthusiastically embraced by anti-vaccination activists. David Gorski commented in Science-Based Medicine that Thacker's article presented facts without necessary context to misleading effect, playing up the seriousness of the noted problems.

Authorizations

Although jointly developed with Pfizer, Comirnaty is based on BioNTech's proprietary mRNA technology, and BioNTech holds the Marketing Authorization in the United States, the European Union, the UK, and Canada; expedited licenses such as the US emergency use authorization (EUA) are held jointly with Pfizer in many countries.

Expedited
The United Kingdom's Medicines and Healthcare products Regulatory Agency (MHRA) gave the vaccine "rapid temporary regulatory approval to address significant public health issues such as a pandemic" on 2December 2020, which it is permitted to do under the Medicines Act 1968. It is the first COVID19 vaccine to be approved for national use after undergoing large scale trials, and the first mRNA vaccine to be authorized for use in humans. The United Kingdom thus became the first Western country to approve a COVID19 vaccine for national use, although the decision to fast-track the vaccine was criticized by some experts.

After the United Kingdom, the following countries and regions expedited processes to approve the Pfizer–BioNTech COVID19 vaccine for use: Argentina, Australia, Bahrain, Canada, Chile, Costa Rica, Ecuador, Hong Kong, Iraq, Israel, Jordan, Kuwait, Malaysia, Mexico, Oman, Panama, the Philippines, Qatar, Saudi Arabia, Singapore, South Korea, the United Arab Emirates, the United States, and Vietnam.

The World Health Organization (WHO) authorized it for emergency use.

In the United States, an emergency use authorization (EUA) is "a mechanism to facilitate the availability and use of medical countermeasures, including vaccines, during public health emergencies, such as the current COVID19 pandemic", according to the Food and Drug Administration (FDA). Pfizer applied for an EUA on 20 November 2020, and the FDA approved the application three weeks later on 11 December 2020. The US Centers for Disease Control and Prevention (CDC) Advisory Committee on Immunization Practices (ACIP) approved recommendations for vaccination of those aged sixteen years or older. Following the EUA issuance, BioNTech and Pfizer continued the PhaseIII clinical trial to finalize safety and efficacy data, leading to application for licensure (approval) of the vaccine in the United States. On 10 May 2021, the US FDA also authorized the vaccine for people aged 12 to 15 under an expanded EUA. The FDA recommendation was endorsed by the ACIP and adopted by the CDC on 12 May 2021. In October 2021, the EUA was expanded to include children aged 5 through 11 years of age. In June 2022, the EUA was expanded to include children aged six months through four years of age.

On 16 February 2021, the South African Health Products Regulatory Authority (SAHPRA) in South Africa issued Section 21, Emergency Use Approval for the vaccine.

On 5 May 2021, Health Canada authorized the vaccine for people aged 12 to 15. On 18 May 2021, Singapore's Health Sciences Authority authorized the vaccine for people aged 12 to 15. The European Medicines Agency (EMA) followed suit on 28 May 2021.

On 4 June 2021, the UK Medicines and Healthcare products Regulatory Agency (MHRA) came to a similar decision and approved the use of the vaccine for people twelve years of age and older.

Standard
On 19 December 2020, the Swiss Agency for Therapeutic Products (Swissmedic) granted temporary authorization for the Pfizer–BioNTech COVID19 vaccine for regular use, two months after receiving the application, saying the vaccine fully complied with the requirements of safety, efficacy and quality. This is the first authorization under a standard procedure.

On 21 December 2020, the Committee for Medicinal Products for Human Use (CHMP) of the European Medicines Agency (EMA) recommended granting conditional marketing authorization for the Pfizer–BioNTech COVID19 vaccine under the brand name Comirnaty. The recommendation was accepted by the European Commission the same day.

On 23 February 2021, the Brazilian Health Regulatory Agency approved the Pfizer–BioNTech COVID19 vaccine under its standard marketing authorization procedure. In June 2021, the approval was extended to those aged twelve or over. Pfizer's negotiation process with Brazil (and other Latin American countries) was described as "bullying". The contract prohibits the state of Brazil from publicly discussing the existence or the terms of their agreement with Pfizer–BioNTech without the former's written consent. Brazil was also restricted from donating or receiving donations of vaccines.

In July 2021, the U.S. Food and Drug Administration (FDA) granted priority review designation for the biologics license application (BLA) for the Pfizer–BioNTech COVID-19 vaccine with a goal date for the decision in January 2022. On 23 August 2021, the FDA approved the vaccine for use for those aged sixteen years and older.

The Pfizer-BioNTech Comirnaty COVID-19 vaccine was authorized in Canada on 16 September 2021, for people aged twelve and older.

In July 2022, the FDA approved the vaccine for use for those aged twelve years and older.

In September 2022, the CHMP of the EMA recommended converting the conditional marketing authorizations of the vaccine into standard marketing authorizations. The recommendation covers all existing and upcoming adapted Comirnaty vaccines, including the adapted Comirnaty Original/Omicron BA.1 (tozinameran/riltozinameran) and Comirnaty Original/Omicron BA.4/5 (tozinameran/famtozinameran).

Further development

Homologous prime-boost vaccination

On 29 July 2021, Israel's Prime Minister announced that the country was rolling out a third dose of the Pfizer-BioNTech vaccine to people over the age of 60, based on data that suggested significant waning immunity from infection over time for those with two doses. The country expanded the availability to all Israelis over the age of 12, after five months since their second shot. On 29 August 2021, Israel's coronavirus czar announced that Israelis who had not received a booster shot within six months of their second dose would lose access to the country's green pass vaccine passport. Studies performed in Israel found that a third dose reduced the incidence of serious illness.

On 18 August 2021, the United States Department of Health and Human Services (HHS) announced a plan to offer a booster dose eight months after the second dose, citing evidence of reduced protection against mild and moderate disease and the possibility of reduced protection against severe disease, hospitalization, and death. The US Food and Drug Administration (FDA) and the Centers for Disease Control and Prevention (CDC) authorized the use of an additional mRNA vaccine dose for immunocompromised individuals at that time. Scientists and the WHO noted in August 2021, the lack of evidence on the need for a booster dose for healthy people and that the vaccine remains effective against severe disease months after administration. In a statement, the WHO and Strategic Advisory Group of Experts (SAGE) said that, while protection against infection may be diminished, protection against severe disease will likely be retained due to cell-mediated immunity. Research into optimal timing for boosters is ongoing, and a booster too early may lead to less robust protection.

In September 2021, the FDA and CDC authorizations were extended to provide a third shot for other specific groups.

In October 2021, the European Medicines Agency (EMA) stated that a booster shot of the vaccine could be given to healthy people, aged 18 years and older, at least six months after their second dose. It also stated that people with "severely weakened" immune systems can receive an extra dose of either the Pfizer-BioNTech vaccine or the Moderna vaccine starting at least 28 days after their second dose. The final approval to provide booster shots in the European Union will be decided by each national government.

In October 2021, the FDA and the CDC authorized the use of either homologous or heterologous vaccine booster doses.

In October 2021, the Australian Therapeutic Goods Administration (TGA) provisionally approved a booster dose of Comirnaty for people 18 years of age and older.

In January 2022, the FDA expanded the emergency use authorization to provide for the use of a vaccine booster dose to those aged 12 through 15 years of age, and it shortened the waiting period after primary vaccination to five months from six months.

In May 2022, the FDA expanded the emergency use authorization to provide for the use of a vaccine booster dose to those aged 5 through 11 years of age.

In August 2022, the FDA revoked the emergency use authorization for the monovalent vaccine booster for people aged twelve years of age and older and replaced it with an emergency use authorization for the bivalent vaccine booster dose for the same age group.

Heterologous prime-boost vaccination

In October 2021, the US Food and Drug Administration (FDA) and the Centers for Disease Control and Prevention (CDC) authorized the use of either homologous or heterologous vaccine booster doses. The authorization was expanded to include all adults in November 2021.

Bivalent booster vaccination
In August 2022, the "Pfizer-BioNTech COVID-19 Vaccine, Bivalent (Original and Omicron BA.4/BA.5)" (in short: "COVID-19 Vaccine, Bivalent") received an emergency use authorization from the US Food and Drug Administration (FDA) for use as a booster dose in individuals aged twelve years of age and older. One dose contains 15mcg of "a nucleoside-modified messenger RNA (modRNA) encoding the viral spike (S) glycoprotein of SARS-CoV-2 Wuhan-Hu-1 strain (Original)" and 15mcg "of modRNA encoding the S glycoprotein of SARS-CoV-2 Omicron variant lineages BA.4 and BA.5 (Omicron BA.4/BA.5)".

The bivalent vaccine authorized in the United States is different from the one that was authorized for use in the United Kingdom as the latter contains as second modRNA component 15mcg of modRNA enocoding the S gylcoprotein of the earlier BA.1 variant.

In September 2022, the European Union authorized both the BA.1 and the BA.4/BA.5 booster versions of the bivalent vaccine for people aged twelve years of age and older.

While the Omicron BA.1 vaccine has been tested in a clinical study, the Omicron BA.4/BA.5 vaccine was only tested in pre-clinical studies. According to the published presentation, the neutralization responses of Omicron BA.4/BA.5 monovalent, Omicron BA.1 mononvalent, Omicron BA.4/BA.5 bivalent and the original BNT162b2 vaccine have been explored in a study with BALB/c-mice.

In October 2022, the FDA amended the authorization for the bivalent booster to cover people aged five years of age and older.

In December 2022, the FDA amended the authorization for the bivalent booster to be used as the third dose in people aged six months through four years of age.

Society and culture 
About 649million doses of the Pfizer–BioNTech COVID-19 vaccine, including about 55million doses in children and adolescents (below 18 years of age) were administered in the EU/EEA from authorization to 26 June 2022.

Brand names 

BNT162b2 was the code name during development and testing, tozinameran is the recommended international nonproprietary name (INN), and Comirnaty is the brand name. According to BioNTech, the name Comirnaty "represents a combination of the terms COVID19, mRNA, community, and immunity".

Economics 
Pfizer reported revenue of million from the Pfizer–BioNTech COVID-19 vaccine in 2020, and $36 billion in 2021.

By mid-December 2020, Pfizer had agreements to supply 300million doses to the European Union, 120million doses to Japan, 40million doses (10million before 2021) to the United Kingdom, 20million doses to Canada, an unspecified number of doses to Singapore, and 34.4million doses to Mexico. Fosun also has agreements to supply 10million doses to Hong Kong and Macau.

Accounts of how Pfizer's got its way into a large deal to provide 1.8 billion doses of its vaccine to the European Union were described by the New York Times as "a striking alignment of political survival and corporate hustle".

Access 
Pfizer has been accused of hindering vaccine equity. In 2021, Pfizer delivered only 39% of the contractually agreed doses to the COVAX programme, a number that equals 1.5% of all vaccines produced by Pfizer. The company sold 67% of their doses to high-income countries and sold none directly to low-income countries.

Pfizer actively lobbied against the temporary lift of intellectual property rights which would allow the vaccine to be produced by others without having to pay a royalty fee.

Misinformation 

Videos on video-sharing platforms circulated around May 2021 showing people having magnets stick to their arms after receiving the vaccine, purportedly demonstrating the conspiracy theory that vaccines contain microchips, but these videos have been debunked.

Notes

References

Further reading

External links

 Global Information About Pfizer–BioNTech COVID-19 Vaccine (also known as BNT162b2 or as Comirnaty) by Pfizer
 Entry in the Drug Information Portal of the U.S. National Library of Medicine
 Comirnaty Safety Updates from the European Medicines Agency
 Product information from the Centers for Disease Control and Prevention

BioNTech
Clinical trials
American COVID-19 vaccines
German COVID-19 vaccines
Pfizer
Products introduced in 2020
RNA vaccines
COVID-19 vaccination in the United States
2020 in biotechnology
2020 in medicine